Compared to other major professional sports leagues in North America, the National Football League has the lowest share of players born outside the United States. In 2017, roughly 3% of active players were born outside the US. In recent drafts, teams have made efforts to search for prospects internationally. A record 12 international players were drafted in 2015. As of the 2020 NFL season, Canada was the most represented non-US country in the NFL with 12 players, followed by Nigeria with 8 and Australia with 6.

International athletes have played in the NFL since the league's founding in 1920. There have been 9 foreign-born players inducted into the Pro Football Hall of Fame. Many international players have found success on special teams; two of the three highest scorers in NFL history were foreign born: kickers Morten Andersen of Denmark and Gary Anderson of South Africa. Canada is the all-time most represented foreign country, with 107 players, followed by Germany with 80 players and Jamaica with 40.

History

Beginnings
At least nine foreign-born players played in the inaugural 1920 NFL season. These included: 
 German brothers John Nesser and Phil Nesser for the Columbus Panhandles. They were part of the Nesser Brothers, one of American football's most famous families of the early 20th century.
 Canadian Tommy Hughitt, player-coach for the Buffalo All-Americans. A star quarterback for the Michigan Wolverines football team before joining the NFL, he was named to the 1922 All-Pro Team by George Halas. As Buffalo's head coach, he led the team to 34 wins, 15 losses, and 7 ties from 1920 to 1924.
 Irishman Bob Nash for the Akron Pros. He contributed to several firsts in NFL history, including being the first player to score a touchdown on a fumble recovery and later was the first captain of the New York Giants. He was also part of the first player-trade between league teams when he was sold to the Buffalo All-Americans prior to a game in 1920 for $300 and five percent of the gate receipts.

Latin America
The first Latino to play in the NFL was Ignacio Saturnino "Lou" Molinet, a Cuban who signed with the Frankford Yellow Jackets in 1927. His contract was donated to the Pro Football Hall of Fame by his daughter in 2000. Following Molinet were brothers Jess Rodriguez and Kelly Rodriguez of Spain: Jess was a tailback for the Buffalo Bisons in 1929, while Kelly played for the Yellow Jackets and Minneapolis Red Jackets in 1930.

In 1944, the Philadelphia Eagles drafted Steve Van Buren, a halfback born in La Ceiba, Honduras, to an American father and a Spanish mother. He played eight seasons for the Eagles, and retired as the NFL's career leader in rushing attempts, rushing yards, and rushing touchdowns. In 1965, Van Buren became the first Latino inducted into the Pro Football Hall of Fame.

In 1948, the Los Angeles Rams drafted Tom Fears. Fears was born in Guadalajara, Mexico, to an American father and a Mexican mother. He led the Rams' receiving game as a split end from 1948 to 1956, winning an NFL championship with the team in 1951. He later became the first Latino head coach in the history of the league, heading the New Orleans Saints staff from their inauguration in 1967, through the 1970 season. Fears was inducted into the Pro Football Hall of Fame in 1970.

The first Colombian player in the NFL was Jairo Peñaranda, born in 1958 in Barranquilla. He played for the Los Angeles Rams and the Philadelphia Eagles. He would be followed by Fuad Reveiz, born in 1963 in Bogotá. Reveiz played for the Miami Dolphins during the 1985 season, and later for the San Diego Chargers and Minnesota Vikings. During his 11 years as a professional, he scored 188 field goals and 367 extra points.

Martín Gramática, an Argentinian, was selected by the Tampa Bay Buccaneers as a placekicker in the 1999 NFL Draft. He later played for the Indianapolis Colts, Dallas Cowboys, and New Orleans Saints. Sammis Reyes was the first Chilean to play in the NFL, signed as a free agent by the Washington Commanders in 2021, playing primarily on special teams.

Europe
Several native Europeans played in the NFL's inaugural 1920 season, including fullback John Barsha of Russia, tackle John Kvist of Sweden, end Bob Nash of Ireland, and brothers John and Phil Nesser from Germany. Later, Bronko Nagurski signed with the Chicago Bears—although born in Canada, he was the son of Ukrainian immigrants and well known for his Ukrainian heritage. Born Bronislau Nagurski, he became renowned for his extraordinary strength and power as a fullback and linebacker for the Bears in the 1930s.

Fullback Ace Gutowsky from Russia played for the Detroit Lions from 1932 to 1938, and became the franchise's career leader in rushing yards. Contemporary sources credit Gutowsky with setting the NFL's career rushing yards record with 3,399 in 1939 as a member of the Brooklyn Dodgers.

In 1950, the San Francisco 49ers used their first draft pick as an NFL franchise on Leo Nomellini, a defensive tackle from the University of Minnesota who was born in Lucca, Italy, and moved to Chicago at a young age. Nomellini played with the 49ers until he retired in 1963 after 10 Pro Bowl invitations and nine All-Pro selections. He was inducted into the Pro Football Hall of Fame in 1969 and the Italian American Sports Hall of Fame in 1979.

Garo Yepremian, born in Larnaca, Cyprus, was a placekicker for the Detroit Lions, Miami Dolphins, New Orleans Saints, and Tampa Bay Buccaneers during a career from 1966 to 1981. He won two Super Bowls and was a two-time Pro Bowl selection with the Dolphins, and is a member of the NFL 1970s All-Decade Team. But Yepremian may best be remembered for a blunder during the Dolphins' victory in Super Bowl VII, in which his attempt to pass the ball after a blocked field goal attempt resulted in a fumble returned 49 yards for the Washington Redskins' only touchdown of the game.

Scandinavia has produced the two lone exclusive placekickers in the Pro Football Hall of Fame. Jan Stenerud came from Fetsund, Norway, to the U.S. by way of a skiing scholarship to Montana State University. There he picked up placekicking, and was drafted by the Kansas City Chiefs in the 1966 AFL draft. He played 19 seasons in the AFL and NFL with the Chiefs, Green Bay Packers, and Minnesota Vikings and kicked a then-record 373 field goals. Morten Andersen, born in Copenhagen, Denmark, played 25 seasons in the NFL for five different teams. Nicknamed the "Great Dane", he is the NFL's career leader in field goals made and attempted, games played, and points scored. He retired as the career franchise leader in points scored for both the New Orleans Saints and Atlanta Falcons.

English-born placekicker John Smith played for the New England Patriots from 1974 to 1983. Although he led the league in scoring twice and was invited to the Pro Bowl in 1980, he is best known for kicking a game-winning field goal against the Miami Dolphins in 1982 in the famous Snowplow Game. Other notable Englishmen include Atlanta Falcons placekicker Mick Luckhurst, who went on to present Channel 4's NFL coverage on UK television from 1987 to 1991, two-time Pro Bowl defensive end Osi Umenyiora and former Eagles running back Jay Ajayi. While with the Miami Dolphins in 2016, the London-born Ajayi became the fourth player in NFL history to rush for 200 or more yards three times in a season. He also became the first London-born skill position player to play in his hometown, when the Dolphins faced the Saints in the NFL International Series at Wembley Stadium in 2017.

Oceania
In recent decades, Polynesians—in particular Samoans—have found great success in the NFL, so much so that the island of American Samoa has been referred to as "Football Island" by outsiders. According to Forbes in 2015, a Samoan male was 56 times more likely to play in the NFL than a non-Samoan male.

Al Lolotai was the first Polynesian to play professionally, playing for the Washington Redskins in 1945, and the AAFC Los Angeles Dons from 1946 to 1949. Samoans began to make their mark in the NFL in the 1970s with players such as Jack "The Throwin' Samoan" Thompson and Pago Pago native Mosi Tatupu. Thompson was the first Polynesian quarterback in the NFL, and Tatupu was invited to the Pro Bowl in 1986 as a special teams player.

Vai Sikahema was the first Tonga native in the NFL. He led the league in punt return yards in 1986 and 1987 while playing for the St. Louis Cardinals. Sikahema's cousin, Deuce Lutui, also from Tonga, later played seven seasons in the NFL as an offensive guard. Super Bowl XLIII featured two Tongan offensive guards in Lutui for the Cardinals and Chris Kemoeatu for the Steelers.

The Polynesian Football Hall of Fame was established in 2013 to honor the greatest players, coaches, and contributors of Polynesian descent in football history. Native Polynesian NFL players that have been inducted include Thompson, Tatupu, Sikahema, New Zealander Riki Ellison, and Samoans Jesse Sapolu and Maa Tanuvasa. Tongan Ma'ake Kemoeatu, cousin of Chris, was announced as an inductee for the 2018 class.

Asia
Placekicker John Lee was the first Asian drafted in the NFL. He was born in Seoul, South Korea. The four-year, $900,000 contract he signed with the Cardinals in 1986 was the richest in NFL history for a kicker. Although highly successful in college for the UCLA Bruins, he lasted only one season in the NFL.

One of the most popular Asian-born players in NFL history is Hines Ward. Born in Seoul to a Korean mother and African-American serviceman, Ward played 14 seasons for the Pittsburgh Steelers from 1998 to 2011 and previously coached in the NFL. During his career he won two Super Bowls, was invited to four Pro Bowls, and set numerous Steelers franchise receiving records.

Africa
In 1984, Obed Ariri of Owerri, Nigeria, set Tampa Bay Buccaneers franchise single-season records for field goals (19 of 26) and points (95). Ariri also encouraged fellow Nigeria native Donald Igwebuike to tryout as kicker for the Clemson Tigers football team. The Buccaneers cut Ariri after the 1984 season and signed Igwebuike, who went on to become Tampa Bay's career leader in field goals and scoring. A later representative of Nigeria was fullback Christian Okoye of Enugu, who became famous as the "Nigerian Nightmare" due to his powerful running style and ability to break tackles.

Players representing Africa as of the 2017 season include Kenya native Daniel Adongo for the Indianapolis Colts as an outside linebacker, Liberia native Tamba Hali, a five-time Pro Bowl outside linebacker for the Kansas City Chiefs, and Ghana native Ezekiel "Ziggy" Ansah, a defensive end for the Detroit Lions. Despite his young career, Ansah has been called one of the most influential and greatest Africans to play in the NFL. Ansah was invited to the Pro Bowl in 2015 after recording 14.5 sacks and forcing four fumbles.

Australia

Recent seasons have seen a surge of Australians in the NFL primarily at the punter position. As punting is a vital aspect of Australian rules football, many players develop a skill set suited for American football. The first Australian in the NFL was Melbourne native Colin Ridgeway, a punter who played a single season with the Dallas Cowboys in 1965. The first punter to spend significant time in the league was Darren Bennett, who was a punter for the San Diego Chargers and Minnesota Vikings from 1995 to 2005. He is credited with having paved the way for the upsurge of recent Australian punters in the NFL, which includes Ben Graham, Matt McBriar, Brad Wing, Saverio Rocca, Jordan Berry, and Lac Edwards.

Defensive tackle Colin Scotts was the first Australian to be drafted into the NFL, selected by the Cardinals in the third round of the 1987 draft. In 2015, rugby league footballer Jarryd Hayne of Sydney signed with the San Francisco 49ers as an undrafted free agent. He played a limited role in eight games for the 49ers as a running back and punt returner before returning to Australia to resume his rugby league career. Despite Hayne's brief NFL career, Scotts credited him with spurring the popularity of American football in Australia.

Canada

Canadians make the most significant single source of foreign-born NFL players, due to the close geographical, linguistic, economic, and cultural ties between Canada and the United States. Most importantly, Canadians play their own domestic gridiron football code known as Canadian football and have their own professional equivalent to the NFL, the Canadian Football League (CFL). Because the two sports are very similar, American and Canadian players regularly transition between the two leagues. Canadians have played in the NFL since its inaugural season in 1920 with players such as Perce Wilson and Tommy Hughitt.

Active players

This list includes players active as of the 2022 NFL season who were:
 born outside the United States, or
 born within the U.S., but holding nationality in another country from birth.

List of international players in the Pro Football Hall of Fame

Nine former players born outside the United States have been inducted into the Pro Football Hall of Fame.

See also
 List of foreign NBA players
 List of foreign WNBA players

References

National Football League players
Lists of National Football League players
Employment of foreign-born